Jack Hamilton (born 30 June 2000) is a Scottish professional footballer who plays as a striker for Hartlepool United on loan from Livingston.

Career
Hamilton started his career with Livingston and spent time on loan at Penicuik Athletic, and Berwick Rangers in 2018. During the January 2019 transfer window, Hamilton was then moved out on loan to Alloa Athletic.

On 1 July 2019, Hamilton was sent out to Queen of the South on a season long loan. In March 2020 he signed a new contract with Livingson. In September 2020 he moved on loan to East Fife. After scoring seven goals from nine league games for the Fifers, Hamilton was named SPFL League 1 Player of the Month for December.  He was recalled by his parent club Livingston on 8 January 2021. On 29 January, he headed out on loan once again, this time joining Scottish Championship side Arbroath where he scored eight goals in fourteen games and earned Scottish Championship Player of the Month for April. Thus, he collected two SPFL Player of the Month awards on two different teams for the 2020–2021 season.

In January 2022, Hamilton re-joined Arbroath on loan for the remainder for the 2021–22 season, where he scored ten goals in twenty appearances.  He was twice named SPFL Team of the Week. Between his two loan spells, he scored eighteen goals in thirty four games for Arbroath.

On 1 July 2022, Hamilton signed a new two-year deal at Livingston.

On 20 July 2022, Hamilton signed for Hartlepool United on a season-long loan with a view to a permanent deal for the 2023–24 season. He was named in the League Two Team of the Week for back to back weeks on 31 December 2022, and 3 January 2023.

Career statistics

References

2000 births
Living people
Scottish footballers
Livingston F.C. players
Penicuik Athletic F.C. players
Berwick Rangers F.C. players
Alloa Athletic F.C. players
Queen of the South F.C. players
East Fife F.C. players
Scottish Professional Football League players
Association football forwards
Arbroath F.C. players
Hartlepool United F.C. players
Sportspeople from the Scottish Borders
Scottish Junior Football Association players